Barnaby is an Old English surname composed of the Saxon element beorn 'young warrior' and the Danish suffix by meaning 'settlement'. As a given name, it means "son of consolation" and is etymologically linked with the New Testament name Barnabas.

People

Given name
 Barnaby Conrad (1922–2013), American writer and artist
 Barnaby Conrad III (born 1952), American writer, editor, and artist
 Barnaby Diddleum, pseudonym used by P.T. Barnum (1810–1891)
 Barnaby Dorfman, founder and CEO of Foodista.com
 Barnaby Edwards, British actor, writer, director and artist
 Barnaby Evans, American artist
 Barnaby Fitzpatrick, 1st Baron Upper Ossory
 Barnaby French (born 1975), Australian rules footballer
 Barnaby Furnas (born 1973), American painter
 Barnaby Jack (1977–2013), New Zealand computer security professional
 Barnaby Joyce (born 1967), Australian politician
 Barnaby Keeney (1914–1980), president of Brown University
 Barnaby Bernard Lintot, (1675–1736), English publisher
 Barnaby Metschurat (born 1974), German actor
 Barnaby Miln (born 1947), gay magistrate and social activist
 Barnaby Potter (1577–1642), Church of England priest
 Barnaby Ralph (born 1969), professional virtuoso recorder player
 Barnaby Weir, singer, songwriter and guitarist

Surname
 Frank Barnaby, anti-nuclear weapons activist
 George Barnaby, Canadian politician
 Hannah Barnaby, author of Wonder Show
 Matthew Barnaby (born 1973), retired National Hockey League right winger
 Nathaniel Barnaby (1829–1915), English engineer
 Thomas Barnaby (1841–1907), Micmac chief

Fictional characters
 Barnaby, a character created and portrayed by children's television personality Linn Sheldon (1919–2006), in Barnaby & Me (1956–1990, Cleveland, Ohio)
 Barnaby, vampire in the Anita Blake: Vampire Hunter series of erotic fantasy-horror novels by Laurell K. Hamilton
 Barnaby, merman character played by Scott Michaelson in Sabrina, Down Under (1999)
 "Barnaby Bear", the English name given to Colargol, the 1970s Franco-Polish children's character when the show was broadcast by the BBC
 "Barnaby Bear", the English name for Rasmus Klump, a Danish comic strip
 a title character of Becky and Barnaby Bear, a BBC CBeebies television series
 Barnaby Brooks Jr., one of the main protagonist in the Japanese anime Tiger & Bunny (2011)
 Dr. Barnaby Fulton, a main character in the film Monkey Business (1952), played by Cary Grant
 Barnaby Gaitlin, narrator of A Patchwork Planet (1998) by Anne Tyler
 the title character of Barnaby Grimes, series of children's books by Paul Stewart and Chris Riddell
 the title character of Barnaby Jones, television detective series (1973–1980), played by Buddy Ebsen
 Barnaby Littlemouse, character created by English children's writer and illustrator Racey Helps (1913–1970)
 Barnaby Pierce, in the television movie Coast to Coast (2003), played by Richard Dreyfuss
 Barnaby Ross, pseudonym used by creators of Ellery Queen
 the title character of Charles Dickens' novel Barnaby Rudge
 Barnaby Tucker, character in Hello Dolly! (1969)
 Barnaby Tucker, character in the play The Matchmaker by Thornton Wilder
 Barnaby West, character on Wagon Train, played by Michael Burns
 the title character of Sir Barnaby Whig, a Restoration comedy play by Sir Thomas d'Urfey
 Cousin Barnaby, in the Meadowsweet, by Baroness Emma Orczy (1865–1947)
 the protagonist of the Widow Barnaby trilogy of novels by Frances Trollope
 the title character of Drunken Barnaby's Four Journeys to the North of England, poems by Richard Braithwaite (1588–1673)
 the protagonist of the Alexandra Barnaby series of novels by Janet Evanovich (born 1943)
 Dr. Russell Barnaby, evil geneticist in Dead Rising,  a 2006 video game
 Silas Barnaby, in the 1934 film version of Babes in Toyland
 Tom Barnaby, a detective in the novels and British television series Midsomer Murders
 Uncle Barnaby, character in the 1903 operetta Babes in Toyland
 Barnaby, a strongman who appears occasionally on the Family Guy animated television series
Barnaby (comics), a comic strip by Crockett Johnson starring Barnaby Baxter
 Barnaby (comics Tintin), in The Adventures of Tintin by Hergé

See also
Barnby (disambiguation)

References

Masculine given names